Abhay Charanaravinda Bhaktivedanta Swami (1 September 1896 – 14 November 1977)  was an Indian Gaudiya Vaishnava guru who founded ISKCON, commonly known as the "Hare Krishna movement". Members of ISKCON view Bhaktivedanta Swami as a representative and messenger of Chaitanya Mahaprabhu.

Born in Calcutta (now Kolkata) in a Suvarna Banik family, he was educated at the Scottish Church College. While working at a small pharmaceutical business, he met and became a follower of Bhaktisiddhanta Sarasvati. In 1959, after his retirement, he left his family to become a sannyasi and started writing commentaries on Vaishnava scriptures. As a travelling Vaishnava monk, he became an influential communicator of Gaudiya Vaishnavite theology across India and the Western world through his leadership of ISKCON, founded in 1966. He was well regarded by a number of American religious scholars but was criticised by anti-cult groups.

He has been subject to criticism over his racist views against blacks, discrimination against lower castes, anti-Semitism, negative views on women, and advocacy of crimes of Adolf Hitler.

Biography

Early life
Swami was born Abhay Charan on 1 September 1896 in Calcutta. He was also called Nandulāl. His parents, Gour Mohan De and Rajani De, were devout Vaishnavas and resided in Calcutta.

Abhay Charan studied at the Scottish Church College. He is said to have refused his degree in response to Gandhi's calls to challenge British rule. In 1919, at the age of 22, he was married to Radharani Devi, who was then 11 years old, in a marriage arranged by their parents. At 14, Radharani Devi gave birth to their first son.

Religious journey
In 1922, he met his spiritual master, Bhaktisiddhanta Sarasvati Thakura, in Prayagraj. He was asked to spread the message of Chaitanya Mahaprabhu in the English language. In 1933 he became a formally initiated disciple of Bhaktisiddhānta. In 1944, he started the publication called Back to Godhead, for which he was writer, designer, publisher, editor, copy editor and distributor.

In 1947, the Gaudiya Vaishnava Society gave him the title Bhaktivedanta,. He became known by the honorific .

From 1950 onwards, he lived at the medieval Radha-Damodar mandir in the holy town of Vrindavan, where he began his commentary and translation work of the Sanskrit work Bhagavata Purana. His guru, Bhaktisiddhanta Sarasvati Thakura, had always encouraged him to publish books referring to the need for the literary presentation of the Vaishnava culture.

Renunciation
Swami also lived at Gaudiya Matha at Mathura, Uttar Pradesh, where he wrote and edited the  magazine. While there he donated the statue of Chaitanya Mahaprabhu which stands on the altar beside those of Radha Krishna (named Śrī Śrī Rādhā Vinodavihārījī). In September 1959, he was initiated as a sannyasi by his friend Bhakti Prajnana Keshava and was given the title of Swami. He published the first book of Bhagavata Purana.

Mission to the West

Swami was the first Hindu preacher to take advantage of the removal of national quotas by the 1965 Immigration Act of the United States. In July 1966, he founded the International Society for Krishna Consciousness (ISKCON) in New York City. He defended the name, arguing that Krishna included all other forms and concepts of God. In 1967, a centre was started in San Francisco. He travelled throughout America with his disciples, popularising the movement through street chanting (sankirtana), book distribution and public speeches. George Harrison of The Beatles produced a recording with some of the devotees in London and helped establish the Radha Krisna Temple in that city.

Over the following years, his role as preacher and leader of the Krishna consciousness movement took him around the world several times setting up temples and communities in other countries. By the time of his death in Vrindavan in 1977, ISKCON had become an internationally known expression of Vaishnavism.

Through his mission, he followed and preached the teachings of Chaitanya Mahaprabhu and introduced bhakti yoga to an international audience. Within Gaudiya Vaishnavism this was viewed as the fulfilment of a long time mission to introduce Caitanya Mahaprabhu's teachings to the world.

In India
Beginning his public preaching mission in India, he founded the League of Devotees in Jhansi in 1953. On his return to India in 1971, he oversaw the construction of temples in Mumbai, Mayapur and Vrindavan. He started a chain of ISKCON schools.

Swami died on 14 November 1977 at the age of 81, in Vrindavan, India. His body was buried in Krishna Balaram Mandir in Vrindavan.

Views

Slavery

Swami said that black people should remain in bondage.

"The blacks were slaves. They were under control. And since you have given them equal rights they are disturbing, most disturbing, always creating a fearful situation, uncultured and drunkards. What training they have got? They have got equal rights? It is best, to keep them under control as slaves but give them sufficient food, sufficient cloth, not more than that. Then they will be satisfied."

Lower castes

Bhaktivedenta asserts that Shudras require no training:-

"Shudras does not require any training. Shudra means no training. Ordinary worker class. Otherwise other three, especially two, namely the Brahmins and Kshatriyas, they require very magnificent training."

Hitler and Jews

Swami mentioned Hitler to provide an example of materialistic scheming, he also called him a hero.

"Sometimes he becomes a great hero -- just Hiranyakashipu and Kamsa or, in the modern age, Napoleon or Hitler. The activities of such men are certainly very great, but as soon as their bodies are finished, everything else is finished."

He held Jews to be responsible for Holocaust:

Therefore Hitler killed these Jews. They were financing against Germany. Otherwise he had no enmity with the Jews... And they were supplying. They want interest money -- "Never mind against our country." Therefore Hitler decided, "Kill all the Jews."

Women

Most of what Swami wrote about women is deemed negative. Some of his views were:-

"Women in general should not be trusted."

"Women are generally not very intelligent."

"Generally when a woman is attacked by a man -- whether her husband or some other man -- she enjoys the attack, being too lusty."

Evolution

Swami was an advocate of Vedic creationism and referred to Charles Darwin and his followers as "rascals". He disputed evolution, and claimed that:

"Darwin's theory stating that no human beings existed from the beginning but that humans evolved after many, many years is simply nonsensical theory."

Religion 
Swami said:

Other typical expressions present a different perspective, where he pointed out that "today I may be a Hindu, but tomorrow I may become a Christian or Muslim. In this way faiths can be changed, but dharma is a natural sequence, a natural occupation or a connection and it can not be changed, because it is permanent, according to him". While the ISKCON theology of personal god is close to Christian theology, both personal and monotheistic, being a preacher of bhakti and a missionary he sometimes would add that "already many Christians have tasted the nectar of divine love of the holy name and are dancing with karatalas (hand-cymbals) and mridangas (drums)".

His approach to modern knowledge was similar to that of sectarian Orthodox Judaism, where the skills and technical knowledge of modernity are encouraged, but the values rejected. "Whatever our engagement is, by offering the result to Krishna we become Krishna conscious". Similar to many traditional religions, he considered sexuality and spirituality as conflicting opposites.

Other

Swami rejected reports of 1969 moon landing citing his unwillingness to accept that no living beings were found in the moon.

Monuments 

 
A number of samadhis or shrines to Swami were constructed by the members of ISKCON, with those in Mayapur and Vrindavan in India  being notable. Prabhupada's Palace of Gold, built by the New Vrindavan community in 1979, was intended to be a residence for Swami, but has now developed into a tourist attraction.

In 1996 the Government of India issued a commemorative stamp and in 2021, a Rs 125 commemorative coin in his honour.

Books and publishing
Swami's books are considered to be among his most significant contributions. During the final twelve years of his life, Swami translated over sixty volumes of classic Hindu scriptures (e.g. Bhagavad Gita, Chaitanya Charitamrita and Srimad Bhagavatam) into the English language.  His Bhagavad-gītā As It Is was published by Macmillan Publishers in 1968 with an unabridged edition in 1972.  It is now available in over sixty languages around the world with some of his other books available in over eighty different languages.

The Bhaktivedanta Book Trust was established in 1972 to publish his works.

In February 2014, ISKCON's news agency reported reaching a milestone of distributing over half a billion books authored by Swami since 1965.

Bengali writings
 

 
 A collection of his early Bengali essays, which were originally printed in a monthly magazine that he edited called . Starting in 1976, Bhakti Charu Swami reprinted these essays in Bengali language booklets called  (Knowledge of the Supreme) [from 1948 & 1949 issues],  (The Science of Devotion),  (Topics of Spiritual Science),  (The Deluded Thinkers), and Buddhi-yoga (The Highest Use of Intelligence), which he later combined into Vairāgya-vidyā. In 1992, an English translation was published called Renunciation Through Wisdom.

Translations with commentary

Summary studies

Discography

Other works

References

Further reading

 
 
 
 
 
 
 
 
 
 
 
 
 
 
 
 
 
 The Inspirational story of Srila Prabhupada: Penguin Publishers

External links

  – Official online multilingual library of A. C. Bhaktivedanta Swami Prabhupada 
 
 
  – Bhaktivedanta Swami, A. C. (1896–1977)
 
 

 

1896 births
1977 deaths
20th-century Hindu philosophers and theologians
Bengali Hindu saints
Bengali philosophers
Devotees of Krishna
Dvaitin philosophers
Founders of new religious movements
Gaudiya religious leaders
Hindu pacifists
Hindu philosophers and theologians
Hindu revivalist writers
Indian Hare Krishnas
Indian Hindu monks
Indian Hindu missionaries
Indian theologians
20th-century Indian philosophers
Indian male writers
Indian Hindu spiritual teachers
Indian Vaishnavites
20th-century Indian educational theorists
International Society for Krishna Consciousness religious figures
Presidents of religious organizations
Bhajan singers
Carnatic singers
Kirtan performers
Writers about activism and social change
Khol players
20th-century Indian singers
20th-century memoirists
Indian autobiographers
Scholars from Kolkata
Scottish Church College alumni
Simple living advocates
Translators of the Bhagavad Gita
Vaishnava saints
Neo-Vedanta
Missionary linguists
Bengali–English translators